Andhra Pragathi Grameena Bank is a Regional Rural Bank in India. It was established in 2006 as a Scheduled Commercial Bank as per Regional Rural Banks Act of 1976 to provide banking facilities in Ananthapuram, Kadapa, Kurnool, Nellore and Prakasam districts of Andhra Pradesh. 
It is under the ownership of Ministry of Finance, Government of India

The Government of India has amalgamated three rural banks namely Sri Anantha Grameena Bank, Pinakini Grameena Bank and Rayalaseema Grameena Bank to form Andhra Pragathi Grameena Bank.

The bank caters to the financial needs of the rural poor in one of the most backward regions of Andhra Pradesh state.

The Bank is headquartered at Kadapa and presently its area of operation is extended to 5 districts of Andhra Pradesh state.

In 2010 the bank received the "best bank" award from Andhra Pradesh Chief Minister Konijeti Rosaiah.

History and Administration

Andhra Pragathi Grameena Bank was formed in June 1, 2006 after approval from Government of India with the mergence of Rayalaseema Grameena Bank, Sri Anantha Grameena Bank and Pinakini Grameena Bank. Andhra Pragathi Grameena Bank was formed as per Regional Rural Banks Act 1976.The bank's operations are spread in 5 districts of Andhra Pradesh namely, Anantapur, Y. S. R (Kadapa), Kurnool, Nellore and Prakasam with headquarters in Kadapa. Till 2021, the bank is operating with 8 Regional offices with headquarters in Kadiri of Anantapur district, Nandyal of Kurnool district, Rajampeta of Kadapa district and 5 district Head Quarters. The Bank has a net worth of Rs 2777.22 crore and lists on top of banks with those in similar lines of industry. The bank had started initial banking operations with providing loans for priority sector services like loans for Crops and Self-help groups and has now expanded to banking services at Urban and Semi-Urban areas. Additionally, the Bank has added other sectors for providing loans which includes Micro, Small & Medium Enterprises, educational loans, Vehicle loans, Personal loans and housing loans. The bank had also introduced Electronic Know Your Customer (EKYC) facility and is working through 985 business correspondents in these places. The bank has 552 branches in Andhra Pradesh. In terms of bank's outreach in business, its only second after State Bank of India(SBI) in terms of its reach out and banking services to customers and for recovering the loans its placed on top.

See also

 Banking in India
 List of banks in India
 Reserve Bank of India
 Regional Rural Bank
 Indian Financial System Code
 List of largest banks
 List of companies of India
 Make in India

References

External links 
 official website

Banks established in 2006
Regional rural banks of India
Companies based in Andhra Pradesh
2006 establishments in Andhra Pradesh
Indian companies established in 2006
Kadapa